Milton Mendes (born 25 April 1965) is a Brazilian football coach and a former player who played mainly as a right back. He is the manager of Retrô.

He spent the better part of his 18-year professional career in Portugal, representing nine and amassing Primeira Liga totals of 87 games and three goals over the course of five seasons. In 2002, he became a manager.

Playing career
Born in Criciúma, Santa Catarina, Mendes joined CR Vasco da Gama in 1984, after starting his career with Santa Catarina Clube. After a loan at Criciúma Esporte Clube in 1986, he moved abroad for the first time in his career in the 1987 summer, joining Portuguese club Louletano DC.

After featuring regularly for the Algarve team, Mendes signed for Primeira Liga side S.C. Beira-Mar in June 1991. He made his competitive debut for the latter on 24 August, starting in a 2–3 away loss against Boavista FC.

Mendes moved to C.F. Os Belenenses in 1992, also in the main division. The following year he joined fellow league team C.F. União, partnering a host of compatriots and suffering relegation in 1995.

In 1996, Mendes signed for S.C. Espinho in the top flight, and contributed with 12 appearances and two goals in his first and only season. He subsequently resumed his career in the lower leagues, representing A.D. Camacha, A.C.D. São Vicente, C.S.D. Câmara de Lobos and A.D. Machico, retiring with the latter in 2002 at the age of 37.

Managerial career
The Uefa Pro Coach immediately after retiring, Mendes started working as a manager, with his last club Machico. In 2006, he was appointed at lowly F.C. do Bom Sucesso also in the island of Madeira; in the following year, he was named Sebastião Lazaroni's assistant at C.S. Marítimo.

Mendes also followed Lazaroni to Qatar, being his assistant at Qatar SC. He left the club in 2012, being subsequently in charge of Al-Shahania Sports Club in the same country.

On 13 December 2013, Mendes signed for Paraná Clube. He was sacked on 24 March 2014, and joined Associação Ferroviária de Esportes on 4 October.

On 20 April 2015, after being crowned champion of the Campeonato Paulista Série A2, Mendes was appointed manager of Clube Atlético Paranaense, replacing fired Enderson Moreira. He was fired on 28 September, after suffering four consecutive defeats.

In October 2015, Mendes signed a contract with Kashiwa Reysol of Japan's J1 League, but led the club for only three games before resigning next March for personal reasons. Later that month, Mendes was named at the helm of Santa Cruz Futebol Clube in his country's top flight, but resigned on 9 August.

On 20 March 2017, Mendes was presented at CR Vasco da Gama. He was relieved from his duties on 21 August.

On 26 September 2018, after more than one year of inactivity, Mendes was named Sport Club do Recife manager. He was not offered a new contract in December by the club's new president.

Mendes returned to Santa Cruz in May 2019. He lost his job on 9 August, when the team were second from bottom. The following month, he was hired at Campeonato Brasileiro Série B outfit Esporte Clube São Bento, but resigned from the last-placed team in November due to criminal allegations. The case against him was dropped in February 2020.

Mendes returned to Marítimo in August 2020 to lead their under-23 team. In December, following the dismissal of Lito Vidigal, he took over the first team. On his debut on 4 December, the team lost 2–1 at S.C. Farense. On 5 March 2021, he resigned having won 5 of 17 games for the bottom-placed team.

Managerial statistics

Honours
Ferroviária
Campeonato Paulista Série A2: 2015

Santa Cruz
Copa do Nordeste: 2016
Campeonato Pernambucano: 2016

References

External links
 
 
 
 
 

1965 births
Living people
People from Criciúma
Brazilian footballers
Association football defenders
Association football midfielders
Association football utility players
Campeonato Brasileiro Série A players
Campeonato Brasileiro Série B players
CR Vasco da Gama players
Criciúma Esporte Clube players
Primeira Liga players
Liga Portugal 2 players
Segunda Divisão players
Louletano D.C. players
S.C. Beira-Mar players
C.F. Os Belenenses players
C.F. União players
S.C. Espinho players
Brazilian expatriate footballers
Expatriate footballers in Portugal
Brazilian expatriate sportspeople in Portugal
Brazilian football managers
Campeonato Brasileiro Série A managers
Campeonato Brasileiro Série B managers
Campeonato Brasileiro Série C managers
J1 League managers
Paraná Clube managers
Associação Ferroviária de Esportes managers
Club Athletico Paranaense managers
Santa Cruz Futebol Clube managers
CR Vasco da Gama managers
Sport Club do Recife managers
Al-Shahania Sports Club managers
Kashiwa Reysol managers
Esporte Clube São Bento managers
Primeira Liga managers
C.S. Marítimo managers
Brazilian expatriate football managers
Expatriate football managers in Portugal
Expatriate football managers in Qatar
Expatriate football managers in Japan
Sportspeople from Santa Catarina (state)